Prototrox transbaikalicus is an extinct, fossil species of hide beetle that lived in modern-day regions of Mongolia and Transbaikalia during the Lower Cretaceous. P. transbaikalicus is the only species of both the genus Prototrox and the subfamily Prototroginae.

References

†
Fossil taxa described in 2000
Extinct beetles